Azor LeBlanc (October 27, 1927 - July 31, 2011) was a business owner and political figure in New Brunswick, Canada. He represented Shediac in the Legislative Assembly of New Brunswick from 1974 to 1991 as a Liberal member.

He was born in Cap-Pelé, New Brunswick, the son of Thaddée LeBlanc, and educated at St. Joseph's College. In 1948, he married Rose Leger with whom he had ten children. LeBlanc owned and operated a drive-in, motel and store. He served on the council for Westmorland County.

LeBlanc died at the Dr. Georges-L.-Dumont University Hospital Centre in Moncton, New Brunswick on July 31, 2011, after suffering from cancer for 33 years.

References 
 Canadian Parliamentary Guide, 1988, PG Normandin

1927 births
St. Joseph's College alumni
Businesspeople from New Brunswick
New Brunswick Liberal Association MLAs
People from Westmorland County, New Brunswick
Acadian people
2011 deaths